Bhalchandra Telang (1916 – 22 July 1991) was an Indian cricketer. He played in twelve first-class matches for Uttar Pradesh from 1934/35 to 1951/52. He played in the first season of the Ranji Trophy, in 1934/35, and captained the team in his final season of his career in 1951/52.

See also
 List of Uttar Pradesh cricketers

References

External links
 

1916 births
1991 deaths
Indian cricketers
Uttar Pradesh cricketers
Cricketers from Varanasi